Now That's What I Call Music! 63 or Now 63 refers to at least two Now That's What I Call Music! series albums, including:

Now That's What I Call Music! 63 (UK series)
Now That's What I Call Music! 63 (U.S. series)